The men's Greco–Roman 74 kg competition of the wrestling events at the 2011 Pan American Games in Guadalajara, Mexico, was held on October 21 at the CODE II Gymanasium. The defending champion was Odelis Herrero from Cuba.

This Greco-Roman wrestling competition consists of a single-elimination tournament, with a repechage used to determine the winner of two bronze medals. The two finalists face off for gold and silver medals. Each wrestler who loses to one of the two finalists moves into the repechage, culminating in a pair of bronze medal matches featuring the semifinal losers each facing the remaining repechage opponent from their half of the bracket.

Each bout consists of up to three rounds, lasting two minutes apiece. The wrestler who scores more points in each round is the winner of that rounds; the bout ends when one wrestler has won two rounds (and thus the match).

Schedule
All times are Central Standard Time (UTC-6).

Results

Main bracket

Repechage round
Two bronze medals were awarded.

References

Wrestling at the 2011 Pan American Games
Greco-Roman wrestling